Gerrit van Dijk (5 December 1938 – 4 December 2012) was a Dutch animator, film maker, actor and painter.

Biography
Gerrit van Dijk was born in a pious Catholic family in the village of Volkel, in the municipality of Uden. He studied as a fifteen-year-old boy at the academy in Tilburg. He was not very satisfied about the school. "You only learn technique. The creativity you learn is no creativity at all. You know exactly what colour socks you should wear and what your hair should look like, but not how to put something on paper." After having finished his study, he limited himself to teaching only. When he took up the brush after many years to start for himself, his work met enthusiasm at home and abroad. He worked intensively with other artists from other disciplines on projects that often raised controversy.

His painting career ended abruptly when he saw Norman McLaren's films and bought a double-eight camera. He made his first film It's Good in Heaven and continued for the rest of his life. He saw his shift to film as a logical continuation of his work as a painter, and considered his films moving paintings. In 1963 van Dijk married Cilia van Lieshout, a film producer who won an Academy Award for Best Animated Short Film.

In the spirit of time, he turned his back deliberately to classic filmmaking. His films are collages that combine photographic images and image-by-image technique. His critical films of the eighties dealing with social injustice become more personal with an introspective view of the world. 

Van Dijk continually searched for new forms and techniques. There are few two-dimensional techniques that he did not use: cell, cut-out, rotoscopy, pixilation or live action combined with animation.  In A Good Turn Daily Van Dijk chose a technique for each scene individually, with an eye to expressing the content of the scene. In this time of his life, he also started as an actor by a theatre group called Orkater which was set in Haarlem, Netherlands

Gerrit van Dijk has an extensive filmography. His films have been shown at many international festivals and won many prizes. For his films Pas a Deux, which he made with Monique Renault, and I move, so I am he received a Golden Bear at the Film Festspiele, Berlin 1989 and 1998. Van Dijk used the refined technique of rotoscope to make the animated documentary The Last Words of Dutch Schultz. In 2006 he made the film Sold Out in cooperation with Marie-José van der Linden.

In 1998, he received the Order of the Dutch Lion from Queen Beatrix of the Netherlands.

On 4 December 2012 van Dijk died from lung cancer.

Filmography

References

Sources
 Gloudemans, Ton (1990)  Gerrit van Dijk: De kunst van de beweging, Haarlem: Stichting Animated People.  9789094014650
 Heesen, Hans & Veerkamp, Lex (2013)  Ik ben blij dat ik er geweest ben. Gerrit van Dijk Uden 5.12.1938-Haarlem 4.12.2012, Utrecht: Stichting Holland Animation Film Festival. 
 Peters, Mette (2019) “Verf en kleurpotlood. Animatiefilmer Gerrit van Dijk (1938-2012)”, in: Haarlem Filmstad. Harry Hosman (sam.), Eindhoven: Lecturis. 
 Overtoom, Jacques & Koster, Gonda (eds.) (2020) Gerrit van Dijk, hommage aan een inspirerende dwarsligger. Haarlem: Jacques Overtoom / Gonda Koster (eigen beheer).

External links
 

1938 births
2012 deaths
Dutch film directors
Golden Calf winners
Knights of the Order of the Netherlands Lion
People from Uden